The Hwasong-13, also known as Nodong-C or KN-08 under the U.S. naming convention, is a road-mobile intercontinental ballistic missile believed to be under development by North Korea. The changes shown in the mock-up displayed in October 2015 indicated a change from a three to two-stage design.

Development

Mock-ups of the missile were first displayed during a military parade in April 2012 to mark the 100th anniversary of Kim Il Sung. Six missiles were carried on 16-wheel transporter erector launchers (TELs), similar in size to those used by the Russian RT-2PM2 Topol-M missiles. The TELs are thought to be based on WS-51200 frames made by Wanshan Special Vehicle in China, possibly using technology from Minsk Automobile Plant. UN investigators have concluded that the TELs were Chinese WS51200 trucks exported to North Korea for lumber transport. The North Koreans converted them into TELs by installing hydraulic gear and controls to erect a missile. Despite being converted to fire a missile, the truck would not be likely to survive damage from the rocket exhaust like a purpose-built TEL, making it a single-use launcher.

Mock-ups were again paraded in 2013, with fewer discrepancies between them than in the previous year. The KN-08 was paraded again to celebrate the 70th anniversary of the founding of Workers' Party of Korea on 11 October 2015. In this parade, the missile featured a modified smaller-in-length but larger-in-diameter third stage plus re-entry vehicle section design, which has led to suggestions that North Korea might have perfected nuclear warhead miniaturization.

The KN-08 mock-up dimensions are estimated to be: total length of about 17.1 metres; first and second stage diameter of about 1.9 metres, reducing to about 1.25 metres for the third stage. Liquid-fueled ICBMs generally only have two stages for best performance, with a few exceptions (usually when an existing design is upgraded). The three stage design of the KN-08 is puzzling. While a three-stage design is common for solid propellant ICBMs, western analysts say that North Korea lacks the experience and ability to develop a solid-fueled ICBM.

In early 2015, the U.S. Department of Defense announced that although they had not seen the KN-08 tested, they believed North Korea had the ability to put a nuclear weapon on a KN-08, and it was prudent to plan for that threat. The KN-08 theoretically poses a threat to the U.S. mainland, able to deliver a  payload  to the American West Coast. Practically speaking however, its accuracy is likely "barely adequate" to target large cities, mobility would be limited to paved roads, and the system will require 1–2 hours of pre-launch fueling. In 2017, speculations were published that the KN-08 may achieve an "emergency operational status" by 2020.

On December 2, 2017, it was reported that the missile was canceled and that the development team was sent to assist development of the Hwasong-12 IRBM, the Hwasong-14 ICBM, and the Hwasong-15 ICBM. In an interview for Difesa Online, a military-focused website, on November 27, 2017, German analyst Norbert Brugge claimed that Hwasong-10 and Hwasong-13 were likely canceled due to an inability to solve engine problems.

List of KN-08 tests

Initially, the US military identified tests 1 and 2 each as an "Intermediate Ballistic Missile launch failure" from a Hwasong-10 missile, without specifying details. North Korea is silent on these reports. The second launch, on 20 October, took place just hours before the start of the final US Presidential Election 2016 debates.

On 26 October 2016, The Washington Post carried a report from an analysis by Jeffrey Lewis Lewis, a nonproliferation expert and director of the East Asia Nonproliferation Program at the James Martin Center for Nonproliferation Studies. Lewis suggested there was a 50% chance that North Korea might have actually tested their domestic ICBM (Western intelligence sources named this missile as KN-08), based on evidence taken from satellite imagery that the burn scars were bigger than any other Musudan (Hwasong-10) tests. He concluded that the test on 15 October damaged the launch vehicle without flight, but that the missile on 20 October test could have flown for a short distance before things went wrong.

In the same report, Lewis also stated not to place full trust on the U.S. agency StratCom for identifying the missile. He cited that StratCom misidentified the three missiles launched the previous month—it identified them initially as short-range Rodongs, and subsequently as medium-range Musudans; yet they turned out to be extended-range Scud missiles.

News of the tests was also reported by other media agencies, including Yonhap.

KN-08 Mod 2 
The mock-up displayed by North Korea in October 2015 was significantly different compared to previous models, with two stages rather than three. Overall size was somewhat reduced, with larger fuel tanks for the two stages. It was no longer built with extensive riveting, suggesting a more modern structural design, with reduced weight.

On 31 March 2016, The Washington Free Beacon reported that the missile displayed in 2015 was a new missile—called KN-08 Mod 2, or KN-14—rather than a KN-08. The missile appeared similar to the Russian R-29 SLBM, but with an extended range. Rick Fisher, a senior fellow at the International Assessment and Strategy Center, concluded in this report that a missile of this new type with a 10,000 km range could hit Chicago and Toronto, but would lack sufficient range to hit Washington, D.C. from North Korea. The report quickly circulated in Japanese, Chinese, Taiwanese, and South Korean media.

The KN-08 Mod 2 was originally referred to by Western sources as the "Hwasong-14". However, analysts now believe that the missile was inaccurately designated. On July 4, 2017, North Korea test launched a newly revealed ICBM, designated locally as the Hwasong-14, which appeared to have no substantial relationship with the KN-08 Mod 2. The KN-08 Mod 2 missile from 2015, which has never been test fired, is now referred to as the KN-14.

Reactions from Chinese military expert
CCTV-4 aired a 9-minute-long interview with a Chinese military expert discussing the KN-08 Mod 2 and North Korea's potential future developments in ICBM technology.

The Chinese expert estimated that North Korea could have a true ICBM within range of the US mainland between 2021 and 2026 if they can successfully master their Hwasong-10 missile. He stated that the technology and theory behind an Intermediate Range Ballistic Missile is exactly the same as an ICBM, except that an ICBM involves more stage separation in order for the missile to have a longer range. North Korea has successfully demonstrated their stage separation technology in two satellite launches: the Kwangmyŏngsŏng-3 Unit 2 in 2012, and Kwangmyŏngsŏng-4 in 2016.

However, the expert noted two weakness of North Korea's missile development program. One is that the North Korean missiles are based on older missile designs. Since North Korea has conducted only minimal flight tests (compared to other countries with active missile development programs), flaws in these older designs have continued into new missile development. The other aspect is that all of North Korea's ballistic missiles except the KN-02 (at the time of the interview) were liquid fueled, and therefore the preparation, fueling, and launch takes hours. This amount of time would give enemies—such as the United States or South Korea—time to conduct airstrikes and destroy the missiles before they could be launched.

However, North Korea may also be studying Soviet encapsulation techniques such as those used in the UR-100 ICBM, where each missile comes pre-fueled in a maintenance-free capsule with a mean time between overhauls of several years and a preparation time before launch reduced to minutes. This appears to have been proven with the successful test launches of the Pukkuksong-2 solid-fueled ballistic missile, in both land (PGS-2/KN-15) and submarine launched (PGS-1/KN-11) variants in 2017.

See also 

 Pukkuksong-1
 Hwasong-10 (Musudan)

References

External links 
 CSIS Missile Threat - KN-08
 CSIS Missile Threat - KN-14 

Ballistic missiles of North Korea
Intercontinental ballistic missiles of North Korea